Santa Catalina National Forest was established as the Santa Catalina Forest Reserve by the General Land Office in Arizona on July 2, 1902 with . After the transfer of federal forests to the U.S. Forest Service in 1905, it became a National Forest on March 4, 1907. On July 1, 1908 it was combined with Dragoon National Forest and Santa Rita National Forest to create Coronado National Forest and the name was discontinued. 

The Santa Catalina Mountains are located northeast of Tucson and are part of the Santa Catalina Ranger District of Coronado National Forest.

References

External links
 Forest History Society
 Listing of the National Forests of the United States and Their Dates (from Forest History Society website) Text from Davis, Richard C., ed. Encyclopedia of American Forest and Conservation History. New York: Macmillan Publishing Company for the Forest History Society, 1983. Vol. II, pp. 743–788.
  

Former National Forests of Arizona
Coronado National Forest
1902 establishments in Arizona Territory
Protected areas established in 1902
1908 disestablishments in Arizona Territory
Protected areas disestablished in 1908